Once in a Blue Moon (2003) is the second collection of short stories by Magnus Mills.  As in his novels, each is told by an unnamed narrator :
"Once in a Blue Moon" in which the narrator acts as negotiator in an armed siege between the police and his mother.
"The Good Cop" in which he is interrogated by one or possibly two identical policemen.
"They Drive by Night" in which he is picked up as a hitch-hiker by a large lorry in which he sits in the noisy cab between the driver and his mate and attempts to make sense of the conversation.
"Screwtop Thompson" in which he is a child and receives as a present "Screwtop Thompson" a toy whose head unscrews and which came in several guises. The narrator chose a policeman but received a schoolmaster....without a head.

The stories also appear in the later collection, Screwtop Thompson, published in 2010 by Bloomsbury Press.

External links
The Good Cop online text
www.bookmunch.co.uk

2003 short story collections
British short story collections